Manja may refer to:

Places
 Manja, India, a town in India
 Manja, Jordan, a town in Jordan
 Manja, Madagascar, a town in Madagascar
 Manja District, a district in Madagascar

People
 Manja Kowalski (born 1976), German rower
 Manja Smits (harpist), Dutch harpist and 1993 winner of the Nederlandse Muziekprijs
 Manja Smits (politician) (born 1985), Dutch politician

Other uses
 Manja (kite), the glass powder coated kite flying and fighting string
 Manja (magazine), a Singaporean magazine
 Manja (film), a 2014 film
 Manja (novel), a 1938 novel by Anna Gmeyner

See also 
 Mandja (disambiguation)
 Manjaa, a woven bed